Scott Houghton (born 22 October 1971 in Hitchin) is an English former footballer and current Police Officer. Houghton was a midfielder who began his career with Tottenham Hotspur before going on to play for a succession of lower league clubs including Peterborough United.

After retiring from the game, Houghton decided to join the police force. In his first posting as a police officer, he was appointed the on-site police officer for The Voyager School.

Houghton has also had television exposure, as he also appears in the Sky TV Police series Cop Squad that follows the going's on at Cambridgeshire Constabulary.

Honours
Walsall
Football League Third Division runner-up: 1994–95

Individual
PFA Team of the Year: 1997–98 Third Division

External links

1971 births
Living people
English footballers
Association football midfielders
Tottenham Hotspur F.C. players
Ipswich Town F.C. players
Charlton Athletic F.C. players
Cambridge United F.C. players
Gillingham F.C. players
Luton Town F.C. players
Walsall F.C. players
Peterborough United F.C. players
Southend United F.C. players
Leyton Orient F.C. players
Halifax Town A.F.C. players
Stevenage F.C. players
Sportspeople from Hitchin

References